The Albemarle Sound is the third album by the Brooklyn, New York, indie pop band The Ladybug Transistor. It was released on March 23, 1999.

Critical reception
The A.V. Club wrote: "Rich and instantly accessible, The Ladybug Transistor has created a sound, regardless of source material, that's entirely its own." The Hartford Courant called the album "a collection of panoramic, pastoral pop that reflects the sights and sounds of their world with the same loving texture and color that Brian Wilson illustrated the California shore with."

Track listing
 "Oriental Boulevard"
 "Six Times"
 "Meadowport Arch"
 "Today Knows"
 "The Great British Spring"
 "Like A Summer Rain"
 "The Swimmer"
 "Cienfuegos"
 "The Automobile Song"
 "Oceans In The Hall"
 "Vale Of Cashmere"
 "Aleida's Theme"

References

1999 albums
The Ladybug Transistor albums
Merge Records albums